The Bank of Portales on Main Street in Portales, New Mexico, which has also been known as Citizens National Bank;Portales News Tribune Building, was built in 1902 or 1903 and was listed on the National Register of Historic Places in 1984.

It is a two-story  commercial building.

A cafe, Do Drop In, is located at 123 S. Main.  The NRHP nominating form for the Bank of Portales gives "123 Main", which is either incomplete or incorrect.</ref>

References

External links

National Register of Historic Places in New Mexico
Commercial buildings completed in 1903
Roosevelt County, New Mexico
New Mexico State Register of Cultural Properties